Selenium oxide may refer to either of the following compounds:

Selenium dioxide, SeO2
Selenium trioxide, SeO3
Diselenium pentoxide, Se2O5